Dianthus repens, common name boreal carnation or northern pink or cu jing shi zhu (簇莖石竹 in Chinese), is a plant species native to the Nei Mongol (Inner Mongolia) region of China, as well as to Siberia, the Russian Far East, northern parts of European Russia (Komi, Arkhangelsk, etc.), Alaska and Yukon Territory.

Dianthus repens is a perennial herb with many stems clumped together, sometimes erect but other times forming a mat pressed against the ground. Stems are hairless (except in some Chinese populations), up to 25 cm long. Leaves are linear or narrowly lanceolate, up to 5 cm long. Flowers are usually solitary but sometimes in clumps of 2-4, with pink to purple petals. It grows in rock outcrops and talus slopes.

References

repens
Flora of Inner Mongolia
Flora of Siberia
Flora of Russia
Flora of Yukon
Flora of Alaska
Flora without expected TNC conservation status